Sheboygan may refer to:

Places in Wisconsin 
 Sheboygan, Wisconsin, city
 Sheboygan (town), Wisconsin, town
 Sheboygan County, Wisconsin, county
 Sheboygan Falls, Wisconsin, city
 Sheboygan Falls (town), Wisconsin, town
 Sheboygan River

See also 
 Cheboygan, Michigan
 Cheboygan (disambiguation)
 Sheberghan, Jowzjan Province, Afghanistan
 The Creature That Ate Sheboygan, a science fiction board game